Yantra may refer to:

 Yantra (river), a river in Bulgaria
 Yantra, Gabrovo Province, a village in the Dryanovo municipality, Gabrovo Province, Bulgaria
 Yantra, Veliko Tarnovo Province, a village in Gorna Oryahovitsa municipality, Veliko Tarnovo Province, Bulgaria
 FC Yantra, a football club from Gabrovo, Bulgaria
 Yantra, a pattern used in Hinduism for worship
 Yantra yoga
 Yantra tattoo
 Yantra Corporation, a software company acquired by Sterling Commerce